Edwin Roberts Kimball (October 25, 1903 – December 26, 1990) was an American football player, coach of football and basketball, and college athletics administrator.  He served as the head coach at Brigham Young University (BYU) from 1937 to 1941 and again from 1946 to 1948, compiling a record of 34–32–8.  Kimball was also the head basketball coach at BYU from 1935 to 1936 and again from 1938 to 1941, tallying a mark of 59–38.  He served as the school's athletic director from 1937 to 1963.

Kimball was born on October 25, 1903, in Logan, Utah.  He spent his childhood living on ranches in St. David, Arizona and Widtsoe, Utah.  He moved to Draper, Utah in 1918 and attended Jordan High School in Sandy.  Kimball graduated from BYU in 1926 with a degree in accounting.  He later earned a master's degree from the University of Southern California and a doctorate in education from the University of Oregon.  Kimball died on December 26, 1990, at his home in Provo, Utah.

Head coaching record

Football

See also
 List of college football head coaches with non-consecutive tenure

References

External links
 

1903 births
1990 deaths
American football ends
Basketball coaches from Utah
BYU Cougars athletic directors
BYU Cougars football coaches
BYU Cougars football players
BYU Cougars men's basketball coaches
University of Oregon alumni
University of Southern California alumni
People from Cochise County, Arizona
People from Garfield County, Utah
People from Draper, Utah
Sportspeople from Logan, Utah
Players of American football from Utah